Todo Me Recuerda a Ti (Spanish for "Everything Reminds Me of You") is the sixth studio album by Scottish singer Sheena Easton. It was released on November 23, 1984 and reissued by Capitol/EMI Latin in 1989. This is an album of greatest hits featuring three new tracks ("Ámame," "Una Vez En La Vida," and "Me Gustas Tal Como Eres") all sung in Spanish and geared for the Latin markets.  "Me Gustas Tal Como Eres," a duet with Mexican star Luis Miguel, was released as the first single and earned Easton a Grammy for Best Mexican-American Performance - 1984.

The album includes a second single "La Noche Y Tú" ("We've Got Tonight"), a duet with Dyango, a Spanish vocalist. It is a cover of Easton's English-language version of the same song, in which she duetted with Kenny Rogers. The album also features "Mi Corazón Vuela" ("The Wind Beneath My Wings").

The disc was produced by Greg Mathieson and Juan Carlos Calderón and sold gold in Mexico, Chile, and Argentina.

RT Industries released Todo Me Recuerda a Ti on digital format on July 24, 2019.  This is the first time it was released since the Capitol/EMI Latin re-issue in 1989.

Track listing
"Teléfono" ("Telefone") 
"Todo Me Recuerda a Ti" ("Almost Over You") 
"Ámame" 
"La Noche y Tú" ("We've Got Tonight") - duet with Dyango 
"El Primer Tren" ("9 to 5") 
"Una Vez en la Vida" 
"Mi Corazón Vuela" ("The Wind Beneath My Wings") 
"Me Gustas Tal Como Eres" - duet with Luis Miguel 
"No Puedes Dejarme Así" ("Don't Leave Me This Way") 
"Brindo por un Amor" ("You Could Have Been With Me")

Production
Producer – Greg Mathieson, Juan Carlos Calderón 
Engineer [Hollywood] – David Leonard 
Engineer [Madrid] – Joaquín Torres

Certifications and sales

References

1984 albums
Sheena Easton albums
Spanish-language albums
Albums produced by Juan Carlos Calderón
EMI Latin albums
Odeon Records albums